Svay Rieng is a province (khaet) in Cambodia. Located in the southeast, the province juts into Vietnam (Long An and Tây Ninh), which surrounds it to the north, east and south. The only other Cambodian province to border Svay Rieng is Prey Veng. The capital is Svay Rieng while the largest city is Bavet, which is the international border between Cambodia and Vietnam.

Districts and municipalities
The province is subdivided into 6 districts and 2 municipalities.

These 6 districts and 2 municipalities are subdivided into 84 khums and 690 phums.

Geography
The province projects into Vietnam and is referred to as the Parrot's Beak (Vietnamese: Mỏ Vẹt).

Culture
Dance

Svay Rieng province is the birthplace of the Cambodian coconut dance.  It originated around 1960 in Romeas Haek District.  The dance is a performance with coconuts involving men and women.

Notable people
 U Sam Ouer, poet and former UN delegate
Khieu Samphan, former president and convicted war criminal
Thun Sophea, kickboxer

References

External links
 Provincial resources
 Official tourist site

 
Provinces of Cambodia